The Modus Challenge Cup takes place at the end of October between The Royal Grammar School Worcester and King's School Worcester. The event is held at Worcester Warriors home ground, Sixways Stadium. These encounters have been happening since 2007. King's lead the head to head 9-5

2007 - The Royal Grammar School Worcester  20-12
Captains -

2008 - The King's School Worcester  21-7
Captains -

2009 - The Royal Grammar School Worcester  3-0
Captains - Bill Harling (RGS)

2010 - Cancelled (Due to heavy snow)
Captains - Harry Nuttall (KSW) & James Brooks (RGS)

2011 - The King's School Worcester  34-6
Captains - Harry Nuttall (KSW) & Curtis Tonks (RGS)

2012 - The King's School Worcester  15-3
Captains - George Jeavons-Fellows (KSW) & Chip Lawton (RGS)

2013 - The Royal Grammar School Worcester  12-8
Captains - Will Elt (KSW) & Harry Bee (RGS)

Game Video by JDA Media - https://vimeo.com/78177773

2014 - The King's School Worcester  11-6
Captains - Ryan Kerley (KSW) & Will Tromans (RGS)

Game Video by JDA Media - https://vimeo.com/111199599

2015 - The King's School Worcester  32-3
Captains - Jacob Ham (KSW) & Gus Thomas (RGS)

Game Video by JDA Media - https://vimeo.com/144419112

2016 - The King's School Worcester  15-5 
Captains - James Smalley (KSW) & Natt Nott (RGS)

Game Video by JDA Media - https://vimeo.com/189908678

2017 -  The Royal Grammar School Worcester 13-10
Captains - George Bates (KSW) & George Mann (RGS)

Game Video by JDA Media - https://vimeo.com/241548216

2018 - The Royal Grammar School Worcester 32-13
Captains - Max Richardson (KSW) & Tom Berry (RGS)

Game Video by JDA Media - https://vimeo.com/298679050

2019 - The King's School Worcester 22-7
Captains Hamish Stigant (KSW) and Ollie Whicombe (RGS)
2020 - Cancelled (Due to COVID-19)

2021 - The King's School Worcester 39-12, Captains - Alex Terry (KSW)
 
Game video by NextGenXV -

LIVE RUGBY: KINGS SCHOOL WORCESTER vs RGS WORCESTER ...
YouTube · NextGenXV
17 Nov 2021

2020 - TBC, Captains - Laurie Checkley (KSW) and Loic Keasey (RGS)

References

https://vimeo.com/78177773</ref>
https://vimeo.com/111199599</ref>
https://vimeo.com/144419112</ref>
https://vimeo.com/189908678</ref>
https://vimeo.com/241548216</ref>
https://vimeo.com/298679050</ref>

Rugby union cup competitions in England
Recurring sporting events established in 2007
2007 establishments in England